James, Jim or Jimmy Reese may refer to:

 James Reese (author) (born 1964), American author
 James Reese (American football) (born 1968), football coach
 James W. Reese (1920–1943), U.S. Army soldier and recipient of the Medal of Honor
 Jim Reese (Oklahoma politician) (born 1957), former member of the Oklahoma House of Representatives and commissioner of the Oklahoma Department of Agriculture
 Jim Reese (musician) (1941–1991), member of the Bobby Fuller Four
 Jimmy Reese, American baseball player
 Sleeky Reese (James Reese), American baseball player

See also

James Reece (disambiguation)